The 1954 Northwest Territories general election was held on September 7, 1954. It was the only provincial / territorial election held in Canada that year.

This election saw the number of elected candidates increase by one.

Election summary

Appointed members

Note:
Frank Cunningham was also deputy commissioner.

Elected members
For complete electoral history, see individual districts

References

External links
History of the North

Northwest Territories
Elections in the Northwest Territories
September 1954 events in Canada
20th century in the Northwest Territories
1954 in the Northwest Territories